The 2022 Michigan Intercollegiate Athletic Association season was the season of college football played by the seven member schools of the Michigan Intercollegiate Athletic Association (MIAA) as part of the 2022 NCAA Division III football season.

The Alma Scots compiled a 10–0 record in the regular season and won the program's first MIAA championship since 2004.

Conference overview

Teams

Alma

The 2022 Alma Scots football team represented the Alma College as a member of the Michigan Intercollegiate Athletic Association (MIAA) during the 2022 NCAA Division III football season. In their fifth season under head coach Jason Couch, the Scots compiled an 11–1 record (6–0 against conference opponents), won the MIAA championship, and were ranked No. 23 nationally at the end of the regular season.

The team's statistical leaders included Carter St. John with 2,593 passing yards, Eddie Williams with 1,184 rushing yards and 90 points scored, Nathan Goralski with 52 receptions, Devon Frenchko with 574 receiving yards, and Odin Soffredine with 114 total tackles.

Albion

The 2022 Albion Britons football team represented the Albion College as a member of the Michigan Intercollegiate Athletic Association (MIAA) during the 2022 NCAA Division III football season. Under head coach Dustin Beurer, the Britons compiled a 9–1 record (5–1 against conference opponents), finished second in the MIAA, and were ranked No. 24 nationally at the end of the regular season.

Trine

The 2022 Trine Thunder football team represented the Trine University as a member of the Michigan Intercollegiate Athletic Association (MIAA) during the 2022 NCAA Division III football season. Under head coach Troy Abbs, the Thunder compiled a 7–3 record (3–3 against conference opponents) and tied for third place in the MIAA.

Hope

The 2022 Hope Flying Dutchmen football team represented Hope College as a member of the Michigan Intercollegiate Athletic Association (MIAA) during the 2022 NCAA Division III football season. Under head coach Peter Stuursma, the Dutchmen compiled a 6–4 record (3–3 against conference opponents) and tied for third place in the MIAA.

Adrian

The 2022 Adrian Bulldogs football team represented Adrian College as a member of the Michigan Intercollegiate Athletic Association (MIAA) during the 2022 NCAA Division III football season. Under head coach Jim Deere, the Bulldogs compiled a 6–4 record (3–3 against conference opponents) and tied for third place in the MIAA.

Olivet

The 2022 Olivet Comets football team represented Olivet College as a member of the Michigan Intercollegiate Athletic Association (MIAA) during the 2022 NCAA Division III football season. Under head coach Dan Musielewicz, the Comets compiled a 5–5 record (1–5 against conference opponents) and finished in sixth place in the MIAA.

Kalamazoo

The 2022 Kalamazoo Hornets football team represented Kalamazoo College as a member of the Michigan Intercollegiate Athletic Association (MIAA) during the 2022 NCAA Division III football season. Under head coach Jamie Zorbo, the Hornets compiled a 3–7 record (0–6 against conference opponents) and finished in last place in the MIAA.

References

 
 football|Michigan Intercollegiate Athletic Association
Michigan Intercollegiate Athletic Association football seasons